Mahalaza Fanimana is a village in Madagascar located in Sofia Region. It is situated 31 km from Befandriana-Avaratra on the 32 National Road towards Mandritsara which crosses Sofia Region linking the city of Antsohihy to Mandritsara.

In the vicinity are Ambodimotso, Fanimana, Antsiambalahy, Befandriana-Avaratra. Geographic coordinates: -15.393347,48.585262

Notes and references

Annexes

Other Articles
Sofia

Befandriana-Avaratra

Mandritsara

External links
Localisation sur Google map 

Populated places in Sofia Region